Arden Key Jr. (born May 3, 1996) is an American football outside linebacker for the Tennesee Titans  of the National Football League (NFL). He played college football at LSU, and was drafted by the Oakland Raiders in the third round of the 2018 NFL Draft.

Early years
Key attended Hapeville Charter Career Academy in Union City, Georgia. He recorded 15.5 sacks as a senior, eight as a junior and 12 as a sophomore. He committed to Louisiana State University (LSU) to play college football.

Regarded as a four-star recruit by ESPN, Key was ranked as the No. 6 defensive end prospect in the class of 2015.

College career
As a true freshman at LSU in 2015, Key played in 12 games and started the final nine. He recorded 41 tackles and five sacks and was named a freshman All-American. As a sophomore in 2016, he set a single-season school record by recording 12 sacks. He earned first-team All-Southeastern Conference honors from the Associated Press. As a junior in 2017, Key was limited to 8 games due to injury, but finished with 33 tackles, 4 sacks, and a forced fumble. On January 4, 2018, Key officially announced that he would be entering the 2018 NFL Draft.

Professional career

Prior to Key's junior season, he was projected as the number one overall prospect for the 2018 NFL Draft by Chris Trapasso of CBS Sports. In January 2018, he was ranked as the number two draft prospect at the outside linebacker position, behind Tremaine Edmunds of Virginia Tech, by Mel Kiper of ESPN. Key was projected to be an early first round selection, but his off-the-field issues caused his draft stock to plummet. Key ended up being selected by the Oakland Raiders in the third round as the 87th pick overall.

Oakland / Las Vegas Raiders
After having two sacks in the final two games he played in the 2019 season, Key suffered a broken foot and was ruled out the rest of the season. He was placed on injured reserve on November 7, 2019.

Key was placed on the reserve/COVID-19 list by the team on November 18, 2020, and activated three days later. On December 26, 2020, in a Week 16 home game against the Miami Dolphins, Key committed a 15-yard personal foul penalty when he grabbed the facemask of Dolphin QB Ryan Fitzpatrick on a play where the Dolphins gained 34 yards; the penalty and catch put Miami in field goal range and Miami hit one from 44 yards to earn a 26-25 win, which eliminated the Raiders from playoff contention.

Key was waived on April 15, 2021.

San Francisco 49ers
On April 23, 2021, Key signed a one-year contract with the San Francisco 49ers.

Jacksonville Jaguars 
On March 30, 2022, Key signed a one-year contract with the Jacksonville Jaguars.

See also
LSU Tigers football statistical leaders

References

External links

LSU Tigers bio

1996 births
Living people
Players of American football from Atlanta
American football defensive ends
American football linebackers
LSU Tigers football players
Las Vegas Raiders players
Oakland Raiders players
San Francisco 49ers players
Jacksonville Jaguars players